Teuku Iskandar (14 October 1924 – 5 September 2012) was an Indonesian scholar, literary critic and lexicographer.

Life and career 
In 1950, Iskandar graduated from Leiden University, in 1955 he defended his doctoral thesis on the Hikayat Aceh, which was later published as a monograph.

Iskandar was among the founders of the Syiah Kuala University (Aceh, 1961). For about 13 years he taught at various universities in Malaysia (including University of Malaya), collaborated with Institute of Language and Literature of Malaysia to compile the dictionary Kamus Dewan (1970), which became the first and still the most authoritative explanatory dictionary of the Malay language. Then he worked at the University of Brunei Darussalam where he received the title of Professor. After having moved to the Netherlands, he became a professor on Malay and Acehnese literature at the University of Leiden.

Iskandar died in Leiden on 5 September 2012, at the age of 87.

Awards 
Cultural Award Satyalencana from the Government of Indonesia (2017; posthumous)

Main publications 
 De Hikayat Atjeh. ‘S-Gravenhage: Nederlandsche Boek-en Steendrukkerij V. H. H. L. Smits. (RCLOS 992.1 ISK), 1959.
 Some Aspects Concerning the Work of Copyists of Malay Historical Writings // Peninjau Sejarah, 3 (2), 1968.
 Kamus Dewan. Kuala Lumpur: DBP, 1970 (second edition 1984)
 Hikayat Aceh: Kisah Kepahlawanan Sultan Iskandar Muda. Banda Aceh: Proyek Rehabilitasi dan Perluasan Museum Daerah Istimewa Aceh, 1978.
 Kesusasteraan Klasik Melayu Sepanjang Abad. Bandar Seri Begawan: Jabatan Kesusasteraan Melayu Universiti Brunei Darussalam, Brunei, 1995.
 Catalog of Acehnese Manuscripts. Leiden, University Library / ILDEP 1994 / (Codices Manuscripti XXIV) (with P. Voorhoeve).
 Catalog of Malay, Minangkabau, and South Sumatran manuscripts in the Netherlands. 2 vols., Xiv, 1095 pp. Leiden: Documentatiebureau Islam-Christendom, 1999.
 Hikayat Aceh. Kuala Lumpur: Yayasan Karyawan (R 959.81 ISK), 2001.
 Aceh as a Muslim-Malay Cultural Center (14th-19th Century) // First International Conference ofAceh and Indian Ocean Studies February 24–27, 2007. Organized byAsia Research Institute, National University of Singapore & Rehabilitation and Construction Executing Agency for Aceh and Nias (BRR), Banda Aceh, Indonesia 2007.

References

1924 births
2012 deaths
Academic staff of the University of Malaya
Acehnese people
Indonesian lexicographers
Indonesian literary critics
Indonesian Muslims
Academic staff of Universiti Brunei Darussalam